Unnao Lok Sabha constituency is one of the 80 Lok Sabha (parliamentary) constituencies in Uttar Pradesh state in northern India.

Assembly segments
From 2009, Unnao Lok Sabha constituency comprised the following assembly segments:

Members of Parliament

^ by poll

Election Results

2019 results

2014 results

2009 results

2004 results

See also
 Annu Tandon
 Unnao district
 List of Constituencies of the Lok Sabha

References

Lok Sabha constituencies in Uttar Pradesh
Unnao district